Maywood P. Brown (September 1, 1896 - October 1963) was a baseball pitcher in the Negro leagues. He played with the Brooklyn Royal Giants in 1917 and the Indianapolis ABCs in 1921 and 1925.

References

External links
 and Baseball-Reference Black Baseball stats and Seamheads

Brooklyn Royal Giants players
Indianapolis ABCs players
1896 births
1963 deaths
Baseball pitchers
Baseball players from Pennsylvania
People from Washington, Pennsylvania
20th-century African-American sportspeople